Eduardo Bosc (born 29 October 1899, date of death unknown) was an Argentine wrestler. He competed in the men's Greco-Roman bantamweight at the 1928 Summer Olympics.

References

External links
 

1899 births
Year of death missing
Argentine male sport wrestlers
Olympic wrestlers of Argentina
Wrestlers at the 1928 Summer Olympics
Sportspeople from Buenos Aires
19th-century Argentine people
20th-century Argentine people